Florencia Lozano (born December 16, 1969) is an American actress. She starred as Téa Delgado on the daytime series One Life to Live.

Lozano has guest-starred in several primetime television shows, as well as films.

Early life
Florencia Lozano was born in Princeton, New Jersey, to Eduardo, an architect, and Elizabeth, a Spanish teacher from Argentina. She grew up in Newton Centre, Massachusetts, and transferred out of Cornell University to receive her Bachelor of Arts from Brown University, before moving to New York City to earn her Master of Fine Arts degree at New York University's Graduate Acting Program at the Tisch School of the Arts.  Lozano's regional theater credits include Yerma, Antigone, Hamlet, Caucasian Chalk Circle, among others.

Career
Lozano landed the role of attorney Téa Delgado in December 1996 on the daytime drama One Life to Live, and first aired on January 27, 1997. The character became one of soap opera's most popular creations, and earned Lozano a loyal following. In 2002, almost two years after her departure from the series, Lozano was still receiving a significant amount of fan mail for her portrayal of the character. "I so appreciate that love coming at me," she said. "The response to Téa still overwhelms me." She further relayed, "I left because I wanted to try other things. I really want to do more theater, film and television other than the soap. When you're doing a soap, it is really hard to do other things. It just takes so much of your time."

During her tenure on One Life to Live, Lozano was in an Off Broadway play called Lick in June 1999; from August to September 2000, she appeared in Love's Labor Lost, a Shakespearean play produced out of Berkeley in Orinda, CA. In addition to her popularity with soap opera fans, Lozano was named one of "Daytime's Hardest Working Women" by About.com, and titled one of soap opera's "Most Beautiful Women" by magazine Soap Opera Update.

After leaving daytime, Lozano moved on to prime time television and film; some of her television credits are Law & Order: Criminal Intent, Law & Order: Special Victims Unit, Gossip Girl, and Lipstick Jungle. Of her prime time transition to film, Lozano stated, "I'm playing homicide detectives a lot," referring to her roles in Perfect Stranger and The Ministers. "I don't know why," she added, "but I love it!"

To prepare for the roles, Lozano – who had lived in Manhattan for 15 years – visited the homicide division of her local police precinct. "I've been hanging out with cops, and they've been so wonderful," she said. "One of them, Irma Rivera, and I have become friends. She introduced me to a firearms instructor who showed me how to shoot a machine gun, and she took me up to the NYPD training village." Prepared, Lozano portrayed Lieutenant Karen Tejada in the April 13, 2007 release, Perfect Stranger. "I interrogate Halle Berry and I end up arresting Bruce Willis," Lozano relayed. The storyline centers around Berry's character going undercover to solve a friend's murder, and engaging in an on-line romantic life. "It's very mysterious and full of intrigue," stated Lozano. Acting with prominent film stars was a "rewarding experience" for Lozano. "Halle is so gorgeous," she stated, "and she has a very beautiful energy about her. She was fun to play with, open to ideas, and willing to try new stuff and really excited." Lozano said, "Bruce was fun, too, in a different way. He let me push him around and manhandle him. I was surprised."

When Lozano acquired the lead role in The Ministers, opposite John Leguizamo and Harvey Keitel, she was again prepared. Filmed in February 2007, the crime thriller is about a female NYPD detective (Lozano) who tries to avenge the murder of her police officer father by what she presumed to be a cult. But unwittingly, she falls for one of the killers (Leguizamo) in the process. "Harvey plays my partner – he used to be my father's partner," Lozano stated. A fan of Leguizamo, Lozano was excited to work with him. "He was cracking jokes, and we were always busting on each other," said Lozano. "I felt really comfortable with him."

The opportunity to carry a film was a longtime goal for Lozano, who enjoyed the experience. "It's really a great feeling when your dreams come true. It may sound cheesy but I was like, 'Wow, I got what I wanted!'" she stated. "My training in theater and daytime really paid off – I have never appreciated being on a soap as much as I do now, because we moved very fast on this movie."

Lozano still looks to do more theater and is also pursuing television opportunities. Queried on whether she would ever reprise her role of Téa on One Life to Live, she stated, "I will never close any door, especially not a door that has been so wonderful for me to walk through."

In September 2008, Soap Opera Weekly reported Lozano's return to One Life to Live; she reprised her role as Téa in December 2008 and would play the character until the shows finale in January 2012. In the meantime, she guest-starred on Ugly Betty, portraying Penelope Del Rios in the episode "Filing for the Enemy". In March 2012, Soap Opera Digest reported that Lozano would be bringing her One Life to Live character to General Hospital the week of May 7, 2012. Her debut aired May 9, and she last appeared on December 3.

In 2016, Lozano was cast in a series regular role for the second season in the Netflix crime drama series Narcos playing agent Claudia Messina.

Personal life
Lozano is a trained dancer, whose talents range from ballet to jazz, modern and flamenco. She became romantically involved with Christopher Welch in 1997, who was later featured in the 2002 Broadway revival of The Crucible. While New York theater plays kept Lozano and Welch busy, Lozano planned to stay on the East Coast. "I went to California, and I realized that while I could work out there, I could never live there," she stated. "There's just something that feels like home about New York. And there is something about theater that just feels so satisfying. [It] is really what I love to do."

Filmography

Awards and nominations

See also

 List of Argentines

References

External links
 
 

1969 births
20th-century American actresses
21st-century American actresses
Actresses from Massachusetts
Actresses from New Jersey
American film actresses
American people of Argentine descent
Hispanic and Latino American actresses
American soap opera actresses
American stage actresses
American television actresses
Brown University alumni
Living people
People from Princeton, New Jersey
Tisch School of the Arts alumni